Deh Deli (also Romanized as Deh Delī and Deh-e Delī; also known as Deh Delī Yek and Deh Valī) is a village in Dinaran Rural District, in the Central District of Ardal County, Chaharmahal and Bakhtiari Province, Iran. At the 2006 census, its population was 106, in 17 families. The village is populated by Lurs.

References 

Populated places in Ardal County
Luri settlements in Chaharmahal and Bakhtiari Province